Herbert Wunsch (1917-1970), was a male Austrian international table tennis player.

He won two bronze medals at the 1948 World Table Tennis Championships in the men's team event and in the men's doubles with Heinrich Bednar.

See also
 List of table tennis players
 List of World Table Tennis Championships medalists

References

Austrian male table tennis players
1917 births
1970 deaths
World Table Tennis Championships medalists